George Law (17 April 1846 – 30 July 1911) was an English first-class cricketer active 1871–81 who played for Middlesex and Marylebone Cricket Club (MCC). He was born in Rochdale; died in Marylebone.

References

1846 births
1911 deaths
English cricketers
Middlesex cricketers
Marylebone Cricket Club cricketers
Gentlemen of England cricketers